The Pont de Bonpas is a bridge over the Durance river, connecting the south of Vaucluse to the north of Bouches-du-Rhône in southern France. The initial stone bridge was constructed between 1189 and 1199, which was destroyed by a 1272 flood. Reconstruction was attempted in 1316 but ultimately failed, and a new bridge was not completed until 1812. This was later damaged by flood and a suspension bridge opened in 1894, but was destroyed in 1944.

History
Prior to the construction of a bridge to cross the Durance river, there is evidence that a reaction ferry was used from 1166. Religious organisation the Bridge-Building Brotherhood were involved in bridge construction, road repairs, and a variety of other tasks. They began constructing a bridge whilst providing housing for foreigners beside the Durance river, and later completed a stone bridge; it was constructed between 1189 and 1199. In 1270 Alphonse, Count of Poitiers granted the Bridge-Building Brotherhood the rights over the bridge over the Durance and confirmed their fiefs, rights and jurisdictions they had in the counties of Venaissin and Toulouse. It was destroyed by a flood in 1272.

In 1316 the construction of a new bridge using stones from the old bridge was authorized but failed in 1320. In 1804 plans to construct a new wooden bridge were made and a  bridge with forty-seven spans opened in 1812. Nine spans were damaged in an 1886 flood and it became a footbridge. In 1944 bridge was bombed by the 1st FG on 17 August with 5 x near misses, no damage to the structure. During the Nazi German retreat from France, Hitler's forces destroyed the suspension bridge. In 1954 a new bridge was completed to allow river crossings, consisting of 12 arches supporting the  structure.

References

Bridges in France
Bouches-du-Rhône
Vaucluse